Ragtime Snap Shots is a 1915 American short comedy film featuring Harold Lloyd.

Cast
 Harold Lloyd as Lonesome Luke
 Snub Pollard (as Harry Pollard)
 Earl Mohan
 Gene Marsh 
 Bebe Daniels

See also
 Harold Lloyd filmography

External links

1915 films
American silent short films
1915 comedy films
1915 short films
American black-and-white films
Films directed by Hal Roach
Silent American comedy films
Lonesome Luke films
American comedy short films
1910s American films